The 1968 Stanford Indians football team represented Stanford University during the 1968 NCAA University Division football season.

Season
The Indians led by sixth-year head coach John Ralston. On the field, the offense was headed by future Heisman Trophy winner Jim Plunkett, in his first season as starting quarterback, and senior wide receiver Gene Washington.

Schedule

Roster

NFL/AFL Draft

References

External links
 Game program: Stanford vs. Washington State at Spokane – October 19. 1968

Stanford
Stanford Cardinal football seasons
Stanford Indians football